Aleksander Onno (15 January 1898 Võru – 11 June 1969 Stockholm) was an Estonian agronomist and politician. He was a member of VI Riigikogu (its National Council).

References

1898 births
1969 deaths
Members of the Riiginõukogu
Estonian World War II refugees
Estonian emigrants to Sweden
People from Võru